Patiram is a village in  Balurghat CD Block of Balurghat subdivision in Dakshin Dinajpur district in the state of West Bengal in India. Patiram is situated beside of Atreyee River. It is 11 km away from the district headquarters Balurghat.

Geography

Location

In the map alongside, all places marked on the map are linked in the full screen version.

Education 
Jamini Majumdar Memorial College was established at Patiram in 2008. Affiliated with the University of Gour Banga, it offers honours courses in Bengali, English, Sanskrit, history and political science and a general course in arts.

There are two Higher Secondary Schools and a college in this town. Patiram High School is near Taltala More; Patiram Vivekananda Girls' High School. Other schools are: 
 Patiram High School
 Patiram Vivekananda Uccha Balika Vidyalaya
 Bahicha L.K. High School(Par- Patiram)
 Patiram Primary School
 Patiram Nichabandar Primary School
 Patiram Girls Primary School.
 Patiram Sahapara Primary School
 Patiram Kadamtali Primary School.
 Patiram Barshapara Primary School
 Patiram Laxmipur Primary School
 Patiram Ananda Margi
 Patiram Monteswary Academi
 Patiram Hindu Milon Mondir

There is a library named Monorama Palli Pathagar

Economy 
There is a vegetable market popularly called Patiram Bazar which is quite big and one nearby Taltala More. 

There is one taxi stand in this town at chowrangi more. Milan mandir(Bharat Sevashram Sangha) is in this town. There is a Government Veterinary Hospital at this village. 

There are 5 banks in this town. These are State bank of India, Bangiya gramin Vikash Bank, Bandhan Bank, Muthoot Finance and Co-operative Bank. Three ATM two of State bank of India and one Axis Bank ATM are available at this town.

Cultures 
The main festivals of Patiram are Durga Puja, Eid and Christmas Day. Nicha Bandar Durga Puja, Arabinda Palli Durga Puja, Pronab Palli Durga Puja, Sahapara Durgapuja and Kadam tali Durga Puja are popular. Kali Puja and Viswakarma Puja are also celebrated here. There are so many Pallis and Paras at this village. These are Nicha bandar, Dakshin Para(Master Para), kadam Tali, Saha para, kachhari Para, Arabinda Palii, Pranab Palli, Dak banglo Para, echamati, pirojpur, baram, etc.

Festivals
Durga Puja, Kali Puja, Saraswati puja and Biswakarma Puja, Shiv Ratri and Eid are celebrated at Patiram.

Patiram Bidyeshwari Kali Mandir is an old and famous temple. Every day, pilgrims worship goddess Bidyeshwari as goddess Kali.
Par Patiram Shiv Mandir is famous and many people visit it at Shivaratri. Patiram Hindu Milan Mandir is known for its cultural activity.

Transportation
Patiram is well connected to district town Balurghat. It is a center point of Hili, Kumarganj, Balurghat and Gangarampur. It is connected to Siliguri and Kolkata by bus and train. Mahinagar airport is only 10 km away. Nearby Railway station is Mallikpur Railway Station at Baul village at 4 to 5 km distance.

See also 
Baidul

References 

Villages in Dakshin Dinajpur district